WVOH-FM (93.5 FM) is a radio station licensed in Nicholls, Georgia, United States.  The station was owned by John Hulett until the summer of 2008 when it was purchased by Broadcast South, LLC. The station changed its format to classic hits on September 29, 2008, became 93.5 "The Eagle" in 2011, then jumped to CHR with "VibeFM" on January 5, 2018.

Previous logo
 (WVOH-FM's logo under previous country format)

References

External links

VOH-FM
Contemporary hit radio stations in the United States